Exister is the seventh full-length album by Hot Water Music, which was released by Rise Records on May 15, 2012. Exister is Hot Water Music's first original full-length album in eight years, since 2004's The New What Next.

Track listing

Personnel
Chuck Ragan - guitar, vocals
Chris Wollard - guitar, vocals
Jason Black - bass
George Rebelo - drums

References

Hot Water Music albums
2012 albums
Rise Records albums
Albums produced by Bill Stevenson (musician)